The third season of Hawaii Five-O, an American television series, began September 16, 1970, and ended on March 10, 1971. It aired on CBS. The region 1 DVD was released on January 22, 2008.

Episodes

References

External links 
 
 

1970 American television seasons
1971 American television seasons
03